Diplacus stellatus is a small herb in the Phrymaceae. The species is endemic to Cedros Island in the Mexican State of Baja California. It was formerly known as Mimulus stellatus.

References

stellatus
Flora of Baja California
Endemic flora of Mexico
Natural history of the California chaparral and woodlands